Ivan Lovrić (born 11 July 1985) is a Croatian football player. He plays as a centre-back for Hungarian club Budapest Honvéd.

Club statistics
{| class="wikitable" style="font-size:90%; text-align: center;"
|-
!rowspan="2"|Club
!rowspan="2"|Season
!colspan="2"|League
!colspan="2"|Cup
!colspan="2"|League Cup
!colspan="2"|Europe
!colspan="2"|Total
|-
!Apps
!Goals
!Apps
!Goals
!Apps
!Goals
!Apps
!Goals
!Apps
!Goals
|-||-||-||-|-
|rowspan="5" valign="center"|Kecskemét
|-
|2007–08
|21||4||0||0||0||0||0||0||21||4
|-
|2008–09
|5||0||1||0||0||0||0||0||6||0
|-
|2014–15
|27||0||1||0||2||0||0||0||30||0
|-
|- style="font-weight:bold; background-color:#eeeeee;"
|Total||52||4||2||0||2||0||0||0||56||4
|-
|rowspan="3" valign="center"|Baja
|-
|2008–09
|14||1||0||0||0||0||0||0||14||1
|-
|- style="font-weight:bold; background-color:#eeeeee;"
|Total||14||1||0||0||0||0||0||0||14||1
|-
|rowspan="3" valign="center"|Warriors
|-
|2010
|31||2||1||0||1||1||7||1||40||4
|-
|- style="font-weight:bold; background-color:#eeeeee;"
|Total||31||2||1||0||1||1||7||1||40||4
|-
|rowspan="13" valign="center"|Honvéd
|-
|2010–11
|13||4||2||0||0||0||0||0||15||4
|-
|2011–12
|29||2||1||0||4||0||0||0||34||2
|-
|2012–13
|26||1||3||0||5||0||4||0||38||1
|-
|2013–14
|24||3||2||0||5||0||4||0||35||3
|-
|2015–16
|21||0||5||1||–||–||–||–||26||1
|-
|2016–17
|26||0||5||0||–||–||–||–||31||0
|-
|2017–18
|20||0||5||0||–||–||2||0||27||0
|-
|2018–19
|11||2||9||2||–||–||0||0||20||4
|-
|2019–20
|29||0||6||1||–||–||4||0||39||1
|-
|2020–21
|26||1||3||0||–||–||1||0||30||1
|-
|2021–22
|25||0||4||0||–||–||–||–||29||0
|-
|- style="font-weight:bold; background-color:#eeeeee;"
|Total||252||13||45||4||14||0||15||0||326||17
|-
|- style="font-weight:bold; background-color:#eeeeee;"
|rowspan="2" valign="top"|Career Total
|
|350||20||48||4||17||1||22||1||437||26'''
|}Updated to games played as of 15 May 2022.''

References
HLSZ

External links
 

1985 births
Living people
Footballers from Split, Croatia
Association football defenders
Association football midfielders
Croatian footballers
Kecskeméti TE players
Bajai LSE footballers
Warriors FC players
Budapest Honvéd FC players
Nemzeti Bajnokság I players
Singapore Premier League players
Croatian expatriate footballers
Expatriate footballers in Hungary
Croatian expatriate sportspeople in Hungary
Expatriate footballers in Singapore
Croatian expatriate sportspeople in Singapore